Harborough by-election may refer to:

 1891 Harborough by-election
 1904 Harborough by-election
 1916 Harborough by-election
 1933 Harborough by-election